South Africa competed at the 2022 World Aquatics Championships in Budapest, Hungary from 18 June to 3 July.

Medalists

Artistic swimming 

South Africa entered 4 artistic swimmers.
Women

Mixed

Diving 

South Africa entered 4 divers.

Open water swimming 

South Africa entered 4 open water swimmers (2 male and 2 female )

Swimming

South Africa entered 9 swimmers.
Men

Women

Mixed

Water polo 

Summary

Men's tournament

Team roster

Group play

Playoffs

9th-12th place semifinal

Eleventh place game

Women's tournament

Team roster

Group play

13th-16th place semifinal

13th place game

References

Nations at the 2022 World Aquatics Championships
South Africa at the World Aquatics Championships
World Aquatics Championships